Meta-DOB, or 5-bromo-2,4-dimethoxyamphetamine, is a lesser-known psychedelic drug.  It is similar in structure to DOB. Meta-DOB was first synthesized by Alexander Shulgin. In his book PiHKAL (Phenethylamines i Have Known And Loved), the dosage range is listed as 50–100 mg, and the duration listed as 5–6 hours. Meta-DOB produces few to no effects. Very little data exists about the pharmacological properties, metabolism, and toxicity of Meta-DOB.

See also 

 Phenethylamine
 Psychedelics, dissociatives and deliriants

External links 
 Meta-DOB entry in PiHKAL
 Meta-DOB entry in PiHKAL • info

Substituted amphetamines
Organobromides
Phenol ethers